Michael Jared Nelson (born August 8, 1994) is an American soccer player who played for Seattle Sounders FC 2 in the USL.

Career

Youth & College
Nelson played club soccer for Lonestar SC before signing a letter of intent to play college soccer at NC State University.  However, his time with the Wolfpack was cut short after making 10 appearances in 2012.  On October 18, it was announced that Nelson, along with teammates Nader Jaibat, Monbo Bokar and Jonathan Ray, were dismissed from the team following their arrests at a Sports Bar.

Following his dismissal from NC State, Nelson transferred to Old Dominion University.  He made a total of 54 appearances for the Monarchs and tallied four goals and four assists.  In 2015, he was named First Team NSCAA All-Southeast, First Team All-C-USA and Second Team VaSID All-State.

Professional
On January 19, 2016, Nelson was drafted in the fourth round (76th overall) of the 2016 MLS SuperDraft by Seattle Sounders FC.  However, he didn't make the team and on March 9, he signed a professional contract with USL affiliate club Seattle Sounders FC 2.  He made his professional debut on April 17 in a 1–0 victory over Colorado Springs Switchbacks.

References

External links
Old Dominion Monarchs bio

1994 births
Living people
American soccer players
Association football defenders
NC State Wolfpack men's soccer players
Old Dominion Monarchs men's soccer players
Seattle Sounders FC draft picks
Tacoma Defiance players
Soccer players from Austin, Texas
USL Championship players